Elmer Williams González (born  8 October 1964; Naguabo, Puerto Rico) is a retired Puerto Rican long jumper.

He won the silver medal at the 1986 Central American and Caribbean Games and the bronze medal at the 1995 Pan American Games. At the Central American and Caribbean Championships he won bronze medals in 1985 and 1989, and then three consecutive gold medals in 1991, 1993 and 1995. Williams was the first Puerto Rican athlete to jump over 26 feet in Puerto Rico.

He competed in the 1992 Olympic Games as well as the World Championships in 1993 and 1995, without reaching the final. He also finished fourth in the 1985 World University Games in Kobe, Japan. He won the silver medal at the Americas Cup in 1989, which is when he set the Puerto Rico National Long Jump record. In 1992 he won the bronze medal in Ibero-American Championships in Athletics in Seville, Spain. He was inducted into the Puerto Rican Sports Hall of fame in October 2011. His personal best jump was 8.19 metres, achieved in August 1989 in Bogotá. Elmer William has been the athletic director in the University of Puerto Rico at Humacao.

References

1964 births
Living people
Athletes (track and field) at the 1987 Pan American Games
Athletes (track and field) at the 1991 Pan American Games
Athletes (track and field) at the 1992 Summer Olympics
Athletes (track and field) at the 1995 Pan American Games
People from Naguabo, Puerto Rico
Puerto Rican male long jumpers
Olympic track and field athletes of Puerto Rico
Pan American Games medalists in athletics (track and field)
Pan American Games bronze medalists for Puerto Rico
Pontifical Catholic University of Puerto Rico alumni
Central American and Caribbean Games silver medalists for Puerto Rico
Competitors at the 1986 Central American and Caribbean Games
Central American and Caribbean Games medalists in athletics
Medalists at the 1995 Pan American Games